Forward Gas Engine Company was an engineering company making stationary internal combustion gas engines in Nechells, Birmingham, England.

The most famous engineer to work at the plant was Frederick William Lanchester around 1895, who made various improvements to their engines, including a self-starting device, whilst designing the first British petrol motor car, leading to the Lanchester Motor Company.

Defunct companies based in Birmingham, West Midlands
Manufacturing companies based in Birmingham, West Midlands